Mill may refer to:

Science and technology
 
 Mill (grinding)
 Milling (machining)
 Millwork
 Textile mill
 Steel mill, a factory for the manufacture of steel
 List of types of mill
 Mill, the arithmetic unit of the Analytical Engine early computer

People
 Andy Mill (born 1953), American skier
 Frank Mill (born 1958), German footballer
 Harriet Taylor Mill (1807–1858), British philosopher and women's rights advocate
 Henry Mill (c. 1683–1771), English inventor who patented the first typewriter
 James Mill (1773–1836), Scottish historian, economist and philosopher
 John Mill (theologian) (c. 1645–1707), English theologian and author of Novum Testamentum Graecum
 John Stuart Mill (1806–1873), British philosopher and political economist, son of James Mill
 Meek Mill, Robert Rihmeek Williams (born 1987), American rapper and songwriter

Places
 Mill en Sint Hubert, a Dutch municipality
 Mill, Netherlands, a Dutch village
 Mill, Missouri, a community in the United States
 Mill, an electoral ward of Magor with Undy, Monmouthshire, Wales

Other meanings
 Mill (heraldry), a mill depicted in heraldry
 Mill (currency), a now-abstract unit of currency
 Diploma mill or degree mill, a provider of illegitimate academic qualifications 
 Nine men's morris, known as Mill or Mills, a traditional board game
 Windmill (b-boy move), or mill, a move in b-boying (breakdancing)
 Mill., the standard author abbreviation when citing a botanical name for Philip Miller 
 Major Indoor Lacrosse League (MILL), the American indoor lacrosse league, now National Lacrosse League
 An older slang term for a boxing match

See also
 The Mill (disambiguation)
 Mil (disambiguation)
 Mille (disambiguation)
 Mills (disambiguation)
 Miller (disambiguation)
 Milling (disambiguation)